Empress He (何皇后) may refer to:

Empress He (Han dynasty) (died 189), consort and empress dowager of the Han dynasty
Empress Dowager He (Eastern Wu) ( 242–264), empress dowager of the Eastern Wu state
He Fani (339–404), empress of the Jin dynasty
He Jingying ( 484–494), empress of the Southern Qi dynasty
Empress He (Tang dynasty) (died 905), consort and empress dowager of the Tang dynasty

He